The  is a skyscraper located in Kanazawa, Isikawa Prefecture, Japan. Construction of the 131-metre, 30-story skyscraper was finished in 1994.

External links
  

Buildings and structures completed in 1994
1994 establishments in Japan
Skyscrapers in Japan
Buildings and structures in Kanazawa, Ishikawa
Nippon Life